This is a list of all programming that aired on the Fox Kids U.S. children's television block on Fox.

Former programming

Original programming

Acquired programming

Programming from PBS Kids

Special programming

Acquired programming

See also
 List of programs broadcast by Jetix
 Fox Family Channel
 Fox Kids
 Jetix
 4Kids TV

Notes

References

 
Fox Kids